Cytohesin-2 is a protein that in humans is encoded by the CYTH2 gene.

Function 

Cytohesin-2 (CYTH2), formerly known as Pleckstrin homology, Sec7 and coiled/coil domains 2 (PSCD2), is a member of the cytohesin family. Members of this family have identical structural organization that consists of an N-terminal coiled-coil motif, a central Sec7 domain, and a C-terminal pleckstrin homology (PH) domain. The coiled-coil motif is involved in homodimerization, the Sec7 domain contains guanine-nucleotide exchange protein (GEP) activity, and the PH domain interacts with phospholipids and is responsible for association of CYTHs with membranes. Members of this family appear to mediate the regulation of protein sorting and membrane trafficking. CYTH2 exhibits GEP activity in vitro with ARF1, ARF3, and ARF6. CYTH2 protein is 83% homologous to CYTH1. Two transcript variants encoding different isoforms have been found for this gene.

Interactions 

CYTH2 has been shown to interact with Arrestin beta 2 and Arrestin beta 1.

References

Further reading